Takue (written: 大工廻) is a Ryukyuan surname. It can alternatively be read as Dakujaku or Dakuzaku.

Only 140 people across Japan have this last name, making it highly uncommon.

See also 

 Okinawan name

References 
Okinawan surnames
Surnames
Japanese-language surnames